The Osteopathic Oath is an oath commonly administered to osteopathic physicians who practice osteopathic medicine in the United States. Similar to the Hippocratic Oath, it is a statement of professional values and ethics. The first version of the oath was created in 1938, and the current version of the oath has been in use since 1954. Although taking the oath is not required or legally binding, it is commonly seen as a rite of passage.

History
The Oath was first developed in 1938 by a committee formed by the Associated Colleges of Osteopathy, headed by Frank E. MacCracken, DO. In 1954, some amendments were adopted to create the current text.

Use 
In the United States, all osteopathic medical schools administer the Osteopathic Oath, often in the context of a white coat ceremony. The Oath upholds the concepts of confidentiality, evidence-based medicine, and nonmaleficence. It also specifically forbids euthanasia but does not address abortion.

In a 2000 survey of United States medical schools, all of the then extant medical schools administered some type of professional oath. Among allopathic schools, sixty-two of one hundred twenty-two used the Hippocratic Oath or a modified version of it. The other sixty schools used the original or modified Declaration of Geneva, Oath of Maimonides, or an oath authored by students and or faculty. All nineteen osteopathic schools used the Osteopathic Oath.

Like the Hippocratic Oath and similar professional oaths, the Osteopathic Oath is not legally binding, nor is it required in order to become a practicing physician. However, reciting the Oath is considered an important rite of passage for a new osteopathic physician.

Text

See also 
 Declaration of Helsinki
 Medical ethics
 Nightingale Pledge
 Nuremberg code
 Oath of Asaph
 Physician's Oath
 Primum non nocere

References

Oaths of medicine
Osteopathic medicine